Yuriy Pavlyk (born February 15, 1994, in Kremenchuk, Poltava Oblast, Ukraine) is a Ukrainian midfielder who plays for Banga Gargždai.

Career 
Pavlyk is the product of the Youth Sportive School FC Kremin Youth System. He signed his first contract with FC Vorskla in July 2012.

Pavlyk's professional career continued, when he was promoted to the FC Vorskla Poltava main squad and on 24 April 2014 he made his debut for the Ukrainian Premier League in a match against FC Illichivets Mariupol.

References

External links 
Profile at Official Site FFU (Ukr)

Ukrainian footballers
Ukrainian expatriate footballers
FC Vorskla Poltava players
Ukrainian Premier League players
Association football midfielders
1994 births
Living people
FC Kremin Kremenchuk players
FC Hirnyk Kryvyi Rih players
FC Hirnyk-Sport Horishni Plavni players
Expatriate footballers in Poland
Ukrainian expatriate sportspeople in Poland
FK Banga Gargždai players
Ukrainian First League players
Ukrainian expatriate sportspeople in Lithuania
Expatriate footballers in Lithuania
A Lyga players
People from Kremenchuk
Sportspeople from Poltava Oblast